Mercimekli or Hapsenas is a village in the Midyat District of Mardin Province in Turkey. The village is populated by Assyrians, Kurds and the Mhallami and had a population of 304 in 2021.

References 

Villages in Midyat District
Mhallami villages
Assyrian communities in Turkey
Kurdish settlements in Mardin Province